Giant Ledge is a cliff located in the Catskill Mountains of New York. Panther Mountain is located north of Giant Ledge.

References

Mountains of Ulster County, New York
Mountains of New York (state)